António Francisco dos Santos (21 February 1948 – 11 September 2017) was a Roman Catholic bishop.

Ordained to the priesthood in 1972, Santos served as auxiliary bishop of the Archbishop of Braga, Portugal, from 2004 to 2006. He then served as bishop of the Diocese of Aveiro from 2006 to 2014 and as bishop of the Diocese of Porto from 2014 until his death.

Following a meeting between the Porto and Vila Nova de Gaia councils, both councils agreed to build a seventh bridge over the Douro river and name it D. António Francisco dos Santos Bridge.

Notes

1948 births
2017 deaths
Bishops of Porto